Ulf Thomas Abrahamsson (born 8 April 1947) is a retired Swedish ice hockey player. During his career he played in the Swedish Elite League, the National Hockey League and World Hockey Association.

Abrahamsson has a twin brother, Christer Abris, who has legally changed his name. He also played ice hockey, as a goaltender.

Playing career
Abrahamsson played three seasons with the New England Whalers of the WHA from 1974–75 to 1976–77. He also played one season, 1980–81, and 32 games for the Hartford Whalers of the NHL. He represented Sweden at the 1972 Winter Olympics.

Career statistics

Regular season and playoffs

International

References

External links

1947 births
Living people
Binghamton Whalers players
Hartford Whalers players
New England Whalers players
Sportspeople from Umeå
Swedish twins
Twin sportspeople
Ice hockey players at the 1972 Winter Olympics
Olympic ice hockey players of Sweden
Swedish ice hockey defencemen